Brandon Damon Allen Ashley (born July 15, 1994) is an American professional basketball player for the Altiri Chiba of the Japanese B.League. He played college basketball for the University of Arizona.

High school career
Ashley attended Bishop O'Dowd High School in Oakland, California, before transferring to Findlay Prep in Henderson, Nevada, for his senior season. He averaged 15.3 points and 6.8 rebounds per game as a senior, and led Findlay to a 32–1 record and an ESPN NHSI national title.

Considered a five-star recruit by ESPN.com, Ashley was listed as the No. 3 power forward and the No. 16 player in the nation in 2012.

College career
During the 2013–14 season, Ashley helped lead the Wildcats to a 21–0 record to start the season before injuring his foot, sidelining him for the rest of the season. The season resulted in an Elite 8 appearance. He was subsequently featured on the cover of Sports Illustrated in November 2014.

As a junior in 2014–15, Ashley was named Most Outstanding player of the Pac-12 tournament. He averaged 12.2 points and 5.2 rebounds per game in helping Arizona return to the Elite Eight for the second straight year.

On April 8, 2015, Ashley announced his decision to forgo his senior season and enter the NBA draft.

College statistics

|-
| style="text-align:left;"| 2012–13
| style="text-align:left;"| Arizona
| 35 || 21 || 20.5 || .525 || 1.000 || .735 || 5.3 || .7 || .5 || .5 || 7.5
|-
| style="text-align:left;"| 2013–14
| style="text-align:left;"| Arizona
| 22 || 22 || 27.7 || .522 || .379 || .757 || 5.8 || 1.0 || .6 || .7 || 11.5
|-
| style="text-align:left;"| 2014–15
| style="text-align:left;"| Arizona
| 38 || 38 || 27.8 || .514 || .333 || .703 || 5.2 || .7 || .6 || .7 || 12.2
|-
| style="text-align:center;" colspan="2" | Career
| 95 || 81 || 25.1 || .519 || .382 || .724 || 5.4 || .7 || .6 || .6 || 10.3

Professional career
After going undrafted in the 2015 NBA draft, Ashley played for the Atlanta Hawks during the NBA Summer League and spent preseason with the Dallas Mavericks. He spent the first half of the 2015–16 season with the Texas Legends in the NBA Development League, earning West All-Star team honors for the NBA D-League All-Star Game. He finished the season in Germany with Alba Berlin.

In July 2016, Ashley played for the Dallas Mavericks and Atlanta Hawks during the NBA Summer League. A year later, after sitting out the 2016–17 season, he again played for the Mavericks during the NBA Summer League. After another preseason stint with the Mavericks, he spent the 2017–18 season with the Texas Legends.

In February 2019, Ashley moved to Cyprus to play for Cytavision Apoel Nicosia. In nine games, he averaged 11.8 points and 6.9 rebounds per game.

After playing for the Sacramento Kings during the 2019 NBA Summer League, Ashley signed with the New Zealand Breakers of the Australian National Basketball League (NBL) on September 29, 2019. He averaged 10.9 points and 6.4 rebounds per game during the 2019–20 NBL season.

Between February 29 and March 10, 2020, Ashley played four games in Puerto Rico for Indios de Mayagüez.

Ashley played for the NBA G League Ignite in the G League hub season between February and March 2021.

In August 2021, Ashley returned to Europe, signing with Fortitudo Bologna of the Italian Lega Basket Serie A. He left Fortitudo in November 2021.

On January 11, 2022, Ashley signed with the South East Melbourne Phoenix of the Australian NBL, returning to league for a second stint.

References

External links
NBA G League profile
Arizona Wildcats bio

1994 births
Living people
Alba Berlin players
Altiri Chiba players
American expatriate basketball people in Australia
American expatriate basketball people in Cyprus
American expatriate basketball people in Germany
American expatriate basketball people in Italy
American expatriate basketball people in New Zealand
American men's basketball players
APOEL B.C. players
Arizona Wildcats men's basketball players
Basketball players from Oakland, California
Findlay Prep alumni
Fortitudo Pallacanestro Bologna players
Indios de Mayagüez basketball players
McDonald's High School All-Americans
NBA G League Ignite players
New Zealand Breakers players
Parade High School All-Americans (boys' basketball)
Power forwards (basketball)
South East Melbourne Phoenix players
Texas Legends players